Colan may refer to:

Places

 Colan, Cornwall, a village and civil parish in Cornwall, United Kingdom
 A beach in the Piura Region of Peru

People

 Gene Colan 
 Joanne Colan 
 Ioana Petcu-Colan
 Nicolae Colan
 Colan, a character in G.K. Chesterton's poem The Ballad of the White Horse

See also
Collan